The following is a list of notable alumni of the University of Mississippi (Ole Miss).

Activists

Abelhaleem Hasan Abdelraziq Ashqar, political scientist, Hamas activist
 Angela McGlowan (born 1970), Republican political commentator, author, and consulting firm CEO
James Meredith, first African American student at Ole Miss; leader in the American civil rights movement

Actors and models

Susan Akin-Lynch, Miss America 1986
Tate Ellington, actor
Cynthia Geary, actress
Anthony Herrera (1944–2011), actor
Kate Jackson, actress
Tom Lester, actor
Gerald McRaney, actor
Mary Ann Mobley (1937–2014), Miss America 1959; actress
Lynda Mead Shea, Miss America 1960
Tate Taylor, director of The Help
Larry A. Thompson, film producer and talent manager
 Heather McMahan, comedian and actress

Artists
William Eggleston, photographer
Ron Gorchov (1930-2020), artist
Lawrence Arthur Jones (1910-1996), muralist and printmaker
Glennray Tutor, photorealist painter

Athletics

Tyji Armstrong, NFL tight end
Kent Austin, CFL quarterback and head coach
Coolidge Ball, college basketball coach
Doby Bartling (1913–1992), college football, basketball and baseball coach
Reginald Becton, professional basketball player
Gwen Berry, hammer thrower
Mahesh Bhupathi, professional tennis player
George Blair, AFL defensive back
Pete Boone, college athletic director
Billy Brewer, college football coach
Johnny Brewer (1937–2011), NFL tight end, linebacker
Alundis Brice, NFL cornerback
A. J. Brown, NFL wide receiver
Jeff Calhoun, major league pitcher
Mickey Callaway, major league pitcher; manager
Van Chancellor, women's basketball coach
Chris Coghlan, major league outfielder
Charlie Conerly, NFL quarterback
James "Bus" Cook, NFL sports agent
Bill Courtney, high school football coach, subject of documentary film Undefeated
Zack Cozart, baseball shortstop and third baseman for the San Francisco Giants
Bobby Crespino, NFL tight end
Doug Cunningham (1945–2015), NFL running back
Roland Dale, NFL end
Terence Davis, NBA basketball player
Eagle Day, NFL punter, CFL quarterback
Tony Dees, field and track, Olympic medalist
David Dellucci, major league outfielder
Jim Dunaway, NFL defensive tackle
Perry Lee Dunn, NFL running back
Patrick Eddie, NBA basketball player
Doug Elmore (1939–2002), NFL punter
Evan Engram, NFL tight end
Jeff Fassero, major league pitcher
Charlie Flowers, AFL football player
John Fourcade, NFL quarterback
Bobby Franklin, NFL safety, college football coach
Rufus French, NFL tight end
Jake Gibbs, major league catcher, college baseball coach
Kline Gilbert (1930–1987), NFL offensive tackle
Jennifer Gillom, Olympic medalist, professional basketball player
Larry Grantham, NFL, AFL linebacker
Parker Hall (1916-2005), NFL quarterback
Greg Hardy, NFL defensive end
Antwon Hicks Olympic hurdler
Gene Hickerson (1935–2008), NFL offensive guard
Stan Hindman (1944-2020), NFL defensive lineman
Candice Holley (born 1981), basketball player
Von Hutchins, NFL defensive back
Peria Jerry, NFL defensive end
Chad Kelly, professional football player
Sam Kendricks, pole vaulter, Olympic medalist
Bobby Kielty, major league outfielder
Frank Kinard (1914–1985), NFL offensive tackle
Dawson Knox, NFL tight end
Greg Little, NFL offensive tackle
Ken Lucas, NFL cornerback
Archie Manning, NFL quarterback, father of NFL quarterbacks Peyton Manning and Eli Manning
Eli Manning (class of 2003), NFL quarterback
Deuce McAllister, NFL running back
Dexter McCluster, NFL wide receiver
Cary Middlecoff (1921–1998), professional golfer
DK Metcalf, NFL wide receiver
Donte Moncrief, NFL wide receiver
Alex Mullen, three-time world memory champion
Michael Oher, NFL offensive tackle
Ashlee Palmer, NFL linebacker
Jermey Parnell, NFL offensive tackle
Pat "Gravy" Patterson, college baseball coach
Jimmy Patton (1933–1973), NFL defensive back
Drew Pomeranz, major league pitcher
Barney Poole (1923–2005), NFL end
James E. "Buster" Poole (1915–1994), NFL wide receiver
Ray Poole (1921–2008), NFL end
Armintie Price, pro basketball player
Kelvin Pritchett, NFL defensive tackle
Brittney Reese, long jumper, Olympic gold medalist
Ricky Robertson, Olympic high jumper
Carol Ross, NCAA and WNBA women's basketball coach
Jamarca Sanford, NFL safety
Seth Smith, major league outfielder
Chris Snopek, major league infielder
Rafaelle Souza, Brazilian soccer player
Savanté Stringfellow, world champion and Olympic long jumper
Marvin Terrell, AFL guard
Matt Tolbert, major league infielder
Sean Tuohy, sports commentator, restaurateur
Guy Turnbow (1908–1975), NFL tackle
Todd Wade, NFL offensive tackle
Gee Walker (1908–1981), major league outfielder
Mike Wallace, NFL wide receiver
Wesley Walls, All-Pro NFL tight-end
 Terrence Watson (born 1987), American-Israeli basketball player in the Israeli Premier League
Skeeter Webb (1909–1986), major league infielder
Michael White, college basketball coach
Romello White (born 1998),  basketball player for Hapoel Eilat of the Israeli Basketball Premier League
Patrick Willis, NFL linebacker
Isiah Young (born 1990), Olympic sprinter

Authors

Howard Bahr, novelist
Larry Brown (1951–2004), author
Hubert Creekmore (1907–1966), author 
Ellen Douglas (pen name of Josephine Haxton, 1921–2012), novelist
Winifred Hamrick Farrar (1923–2010), Mississippi poet laureate
John Faulkner (1901–1963), plain-style writer, brother of William Faulkner
William Faulkner (1897–1962), author, Nobel laureate
John Grisham, author, attorney, state representative
Carolyn Haines, author
Greg Iles, novelist, screenwriter
Florence King, humorist and political columnist (attended graduate school but did not complete the program)
Prakash Kona, essayist, poet
Florence Mars (1923–2006), author
Jonathan Miles, journalist, novelist
Melany Neilson, author
Stel Pavlou, British author, screenwriter (studied as an exchange student)
Genevieve Pou (1919–2007), author
Patrick D. Smith, author
Robert Bruce Smith, IV, Mississippi historian
Donna Tartt, author, attended but transferred before graduation 
Paige Williams, author and staff writer for The New Yorker 
Stark Young, playwright, novelist, and drama critic

Business figures
James L. Barksdale (born 1943), businessman
Dixie Carter (born 1964), businesswoman
Barry Dixon (born 1959), interior designer
Ernest Duff (1931–2016), businessman, lawyer and bishop
Thomas F. Frist Sr. (1910–1998), businessman and physician
Bill Jordan, businessman and host
William Bonner McCarty, businessman
Leigh Anne Tuohy (born 1960), businesswoman and interior designer

Educators
John L. Crain, president of Southeastern Louisiana University 
Glenn Boyce, chancellor of Ole Miss
Henry Minor Faser (1882-1960), dean, School of Pharmacy
Charles Betts Galloway (1849–1909), Methodist bishop
James Bruton Gambrell (1841–1921), president of Mercer University
Thomas Hines, Professor Emeritus of History, University of California, Los Angeles
Daniel Jones, physician, UM chancellor
Robert Khayat, UM chancellor
Rory Lee, clergyman, college president
E. Wilson Lyon, president of Pomona College
Edward Mayes (1846–1917), UM chancellor
William David McCain (1907–1993), segregationist spokesman, president of University of Southern Mississippi
Thomas K. McCraw (1940–2012), business historian
Milburn Price, hymnologist, music educator
Frederick G. Slabach, President of Texas Wesleyan University
Blake Thompson, President of Mississippi College

Journalists and media figures
Sharon Alfonsi, ABC News reporter
Chris Berry, iHeartMedia
Russ Dallen, publisher of Latin American Herald Tribune, journalist, author
Ben Ferguson, radio host and commentator
John Fortenberry, film and television director
Ron Franklin, ESPN broadcaster
Angela McGlowan, political commentator
Donald C. Simmons, Jr., documentary filmmaker and author
Shepard Smith, American television broadcaster
Larry Speakes, White House Press Secretary, journalist, author
Curtis Wilkie, author, journalist
Ben Mintz, Barstool Sports

Jurists and attorneys

Rhesa Barksdale, U.S. Court of Appeals judge
Neal Biggers, U.S. district judge
Debra M. Brown, U.S. district judge
George C. Carlson Jr., chief justice of the Mississippi Supreme Court
Charles Clark (1925–2011), U.S. Court of Appeals judge
Glen H. Davidson (born 1941), U.S. district judge
Bobby DeLaughter, prosecutor, judge
Jess H. Dickinson, associate justice, Mississippi Supreme Court
Jim Hood, Mississippi attorney general
Charles Bowen Howry (1844–1928), assistant U.S. attorney general, court of claims judge
E. Grady Jolly, U.S. Court of Appeals judge
Ann Hannaford Lamar, associate justice, Mississippi Supreme Court
Michael P. Mills, U.S. district judge
Mike Moore, Mississippi attorney general
Charles W. Pickering, U.S. district judge
Michael K. Randolph, associate justice, Mississippi Supreme Court
Richard Scruggs, trial attorney
Sydney M. Smith, chief justice of the Mississippi Supreme Court
Keith Starrett, federal judge
Phil Stone (1893–1967), attorney
William L. Waller, Jr., chief justice, Mississippi Supreme Court

Military figures

Charles P. Hall (1886–1953), lieutenant general, World War II
Paul V. Hester, air force general
John S. McCain, Sr. (1884–1945), U.S. Navy admiral

Musicians
Mildred Allen, operatic soprano 
Mose Allison, jazz and blues pianist
Glen Ballard, songwriter, producer
Colour Revolt, indie rock band
Caroline Herring, singer, songwriter
Guy Hovis, singer
Josh Kelley, musician
Dent May, singer-songwriter
George McConnell, guitarist, musician
Rivers Rutherford, country songwriter
 John Stirratt, bassist (The Hilltops, Wilco)
Nancy Van de Vate, composer
Jim Weatherly, singer-songwriter

Physicians

Carlos Manuel Chavez, heart surgeon
Garth Fisher, plastic surgeon
John C. Fleming (born 1951), family physician, U.S. representative
Thomas F. Frist, Sr. (1910–1998), cardiologist, founder of Hospital Corporation of America
Arthur Guyton (1919-2003), physiologist, author of Textbook of Medical Physiology
Edward Hill, family physician, AMA president
Leonard McCoy (2227-2364), fictional Star Trek character; chief medical officer, USS Enterprise, Starfleet admiral

Politicians
Thomas Abernethy (1903–1998), U.S. representative 
William Allain (1928–2013), governor
John Mills Allen (1846–1917), U.S. representative
Chapman L. Anderson (1845–1924), U.S. representative
Rick Austin, Georgia state representative
Haley Barbour, governor
Ross Barnett (1898–1987), governor
Earl L. Brewer (1869–1942), governor
Ed Bryant, U.S. representative from Tennessee
T. Jeff Busby (1884–1964), U.S. representative
Millard F. Caldwell (1897–1984), governor of Florida
Ezekiel S. Candler, Jr. (1862–1944), U.S. representative
Thomas C. Catchings (1847–1927), U.S. representative
Marvin Childers (born 1961), Arkansas state representative 
Travis Childers, U.S. representative 
Thad Cochran (1937-2019), U.S. senator
James Collier (1872–1933), U.S. representative
Ross A. Collins (1880–1968), U.S. representative 
Robert H. Conn, Assistant Secretary of the Navy 
Martin Sennett Conner (1891–1950), governor
Walter M. Denny (1853–1926), U.S. representative
Aubert C. Dunn (1896–1987), U.S. representative 
Winfield Dunn, governor of Tennessee 
Brad Dye, lieutenant governor
James O. Eastland (1904-1986), U.S. senator 
Cliff Finch (1927–1986), governor
John C. Fleming, U.S. representative from Louisiana 
William Webster Franklin, U.S. representative
Evelyn Gandy (1920-2007), lieutenant governor 
Mary Lou Godbold (1912–2008), state senator
James Gordon (1833–1912), U.S. senator
Gregg Harper, U.S. representative 
Jon Hinson (1942–1995), U.S. representative
Jim Hood, state attorney general 
Jay Hughes, state representative, candidate for lieutenant governor (2019)
Kenny Hulshof, U.S. representative from Missouri 
Paul B. Johnson, Jr. (1916–1985), governor
Trent Kelly, U.S. representative
Trent Lott, U.S. senator
William F. Love (1850–1898), U.S. representative 
Ray Mabus, governor of Mississippi; Secretary of the Navy
Dan R. McGehee (1883–1962), U.S. representative 
Frank A. McLain (1852–1920), U.S. representative 
Hernando Money (1839–1912), U.S. senator
Mike Moore, state attorney general
Stanford Morse (1926–2002), state senator 
Henry L. Muldrow (1837–1905), U.S. representative; Assistant Secretary of the Interior
Ronnie Musgrove, governor 
Rita Potts Parks (born 1962), state senator
Chip Pickering, U.S. representative
Charles K. Pringle, state representative 
John E. Rankin (1882–1960), U.S. representative
Lee M. Russell (1875–1943), governor
Jeanne Shaheen, governor of New Hampshire; U.S. senator
Roosevelt Skerrit, prime minister of Dominica
Frank E. Smith (1918–1997), U.S. representative 
Larry Speakes (1939–2014), presidential press secretary 
Hubert D. Stephens (1875–1946), U.S. senator
William V. Sullivan (1857–1918), U.S. senator 
Kirk Talbot, Louisiana state representative
Gray Tollison, state senator
William W. Venable (1880–1948), U.S. representative
A.C. Wharton (1944-2015), mayor of Memphis, Tennessee
Hugh L. White (1881–1965), governor
Jamie Whitten (1910–1995), U.S representative
William Madison Whittington (1878–1962), U.S. representative 
Roger Wicker, U.S. senator
John Bell Williams (1918–1983), governor
Elise Varner Winter, First Lady of Mississippi
William Winter, governor
Samuel Andrew Witherspoon (1855–1915), U.S. representative

Religious leaders
Duncan M. Gray III (born 1949), bishop of the Episcopal Diocese of Mississippi
Alfred C. Marble, Jr. (1936–2017), bishop of the Episcopal Diocese of Mississippi
C. Brinkley Morton (1926–1994), bishop of the Episcopal Diocese of San Diego

Scientists
Weston Fulton (1871–1946), meteorologist and inventor
Bill Parsons, director of NASA's John F. Kennedy Space Center
Pedro Rodriguez (born 1953), director of test laboratory at NASA's Marshall Space Flight Center

References

University of Mississippi alumni